The Myrtales are an order of flowering plants placed as a sister to the eurosids II clade as of the publishing of the Eucalyptus grandis genome in June 2014.

The APG III system of classification for angiosperms still places it within the eurosids. This finding is corroborated by the placement of the Myrtales in the Malvid clade by the One Thousand Plant Transcriptomes Initiative. The following families are included as of APGIII:
 Alzateaceae S. A. Graham
 Combretaceae R. Br. (leadwood family)
 Crypteroniaceae A. DC.
 Lythraceae J. St.-Hil. (loosestrife and pomegranate family)
 Melastomataceae Juss. (including Memecylaceae DC.)
 Myrtaceae Juss. (myrtle family; including Heteropyxidaceae Engl. & Gilg, Psiloxylaceae Croizat)
 Onagraceae Juss. (evening primrose and Fuchsia family)
 Penaeaceae Sweet ex Guill. (including Oliniaceae Arn., Rhynchocalycaceae L. A. S. Johnson & B. G. Briggs)
 Vochysiaceae A. St.-Hil.

The Cronquist system gives essentially the same composition, except the Vochysiaceae are removed to the order Polygalales, and the Thymelaeaceae are included. The families Sonneratiaceae, Trapaceae, and Punicaceae are removed from the Lythraceae. In the classification system of Dahlgren the Myrtales were in the superorder Myrtiflorae (also called Myrtanae). The APGIII system agrees with the older Cronquist circumscriptions of treating Psiloxylaceae and Heteropyxidaceae within Myrtaceae, and Memecyclaceae within Melastomataceae.

Ellagitannins are reported in dicotyledoneous angiosperms, and notably in species in the order Myrtales.

Origins
Myrtales is dated to have begun 89–99 million years ago (mya) in Australasia. There is some contention as to that date however, which was obtained using nuclear DNA. When looking at chloroplast DNA, the myrtales ancestor is instead considered to have evolved in the mid-Cretaceous period (100mya) in Southeast Africa, rather than in Australasia. Although the APG system classifies myrtales as within the eurosids, the recently published genome of Eucalyptus grandis places the order myrtales as a sister to the eurosids rather than inside them. The discrepancy is thought to have arisen due to the difference between using numerous taxa versus using various genes for constructing a phylogeny.

References

Further reading

External links 

 
Angiosperm orders
Flora of Australasia